Otto Kirchner (1887, Eckartshausen – 1960) was a German painter of portraits and genre scenes.

References

20th-century German painters
20th-century German male artists
German male painters
German genre painters
German portrait painters
1887 births
1960 deaths